Our Thing is the second album by American jazz tenor saxophonist Joe Henderson on Blue Note. It features performances by Henderson, trumpeter Kenny Dorham, pianist Andrew Hill, drummer Pete La Roca and bassist Eddie Khan of originals by Henderson and Dorham. The CD reissue added a bonus take of "Teeter Totter".

Reception
The Allmusic review by Scott Yanow awarded the album 4.5 stars stating "Even at this relatively early stage, Joe Henderson showed his potential as a great tenorman.".

Track listing
 "Teeter Totter" – 8:33 (Henderson)   
 "Pedro's Time" – 10:04 (Dorham)   
 "Our Thing" – 5:36 (Henderson)   
 "Back Road" – 6:19 (Dorham)  
 "Escapade" – 8:05 (Dorham)  
 "Teeter Totter" [alternate take] – 7:10 Bonus track on CD

Personnel

Musicians
Joe Henderson – tenor saxophone
Kenny Dorham – trumpet
Andrew Hill – piano
Eddie Khan – bass
Pete La Roca – drums

Production 
Bob Blumenthal – liner notes
Michael Cuscuna – reissue
Kenny Dorham – liner notes
Alfred Lion – producer
Reid Miles – design, cover design
Rudy Van Gelder – engineer, remastering, digital remastering
Francis Wolff – photography, cover photo

References

1964 albums
Joe Henderson albums
Albums produced by Alfred Lion
Blue Note Records albums
Albums recorded at Van Gelder Studio